is a town located in Katta District, Miyagi Prefecture, Japan. , the town had an estimated population of 1,323, and a population density of 5.0 persons per km² in 626 households.

Geography
Shichikashuku is located in the Tōhoku region of northern Japan in the far southwestern corner of Miyagi Prefecture. Surrounded by the Zaō Mountains, it is bordered by Yamagata Prefecture to the north and west, and by Fukushima Prefecture to the south. Parts of the town are within the borders of the Zaō Quasi-National Park or the Zaō Kōgen Prefectural Natural Park.

Neighboring municipalities
Miyagi Prefecture
Shiroishi
Zaō
Yamagata Prefecture
Kaminoyama
Takahata
Fukushima Prefecture
Fukushima

Climate

Shichikashuku has a humid climate (Köppen climate classification Cfa) characterized by mild summers and cold winters.  The average annual temperature in Shichikashuku is 9.6 °C. The average annual rainfall is 1430 mm with September as the wettest month. The temperatures are highest on average in August, at around 23.1 °C, and lowest in January, at around -2.7 °C.

Demographics
Per Japanese census data, the population of Shichikashuku has declined steadily over the past 70 years and is now much smaller than it was a century ago.

History
The area of present-day Shichikashuku was part of ancient Mutsu Province, and was part of the holdings of Sendai Domain under the Edo period Tokugawa shogunate. It was made part Katta District in the new Iwaki Province at the start of the Meiji period. The district was transferred to Miyagi Prefecture on 21 August 1876.

Shichikashuku Village was established on April 1, 1889 with the establishment of the post-Meiji restoration modern municipalities system. It was raised to town status on April 1, 1957.

Government
Shichikashuku has a mayor-council form of government with a directly elected mayor and a unicameral town council of 8 members. Shichikashuku, collectively with the city of Shiroishi and the town of Zaō, contributes two seats to the Miyagi Prefectural legislature.. In terms of national politics, the town is part of Miyagi 3rd district of the lower house of the Diet of Japan.

Economy
The economy of Shichikashuku is largely based on agriculture and forestry.

Education
Shichikashuku has one public elementary school and one public middle school operated by the town government, and one public high school operated by the Miyagi Prefectural Board of Education. There is also one private high school.

Transportation
Shichikashuku does not have by any passenger train service.

Highway

Local attractions 
Shichikashuku Dam
Zaō Kōgen Prefectural Natural Park
Zaō Quasi-National Park

References

External links

Official Website 

 
Towns in Miyagi Prefecture